Ryanggang Province (Ryanggangdo; , Ryanggang-do) is a province in North Korea.  The province is bordered by China (Jilin) on the north, North Hamgyong on the east, South Hamgyong on the south, and Chagang on the west.  Ryanggang was formed in 1954, when it was separated from South Hamgyŏng.  The provincial capital is Hyesan.  In South Korean usage, "Ryanggang" is spelled and pronounced as "Yanggang" (Yanggang-do)

Description
Along the northern border with China runs the Yalu River and the Tumen River. In between the rivers, and the source of both, is Paektu Mountain, revered by both the Koreans and Manchurians as the mythic origin of each people. The North Korean government claims that Kim Jong-il was born there when his parents were at a Communist anti-Japanese resistance camp at the mountain. The North Korean-Chinese border for 20 miles east of the mountain is "dry, remote and mountainous, barely patrolled," making it one of the crossing areas for refugees from North Korea into China, although most, including refugees from Ryanggang itself, prefer to cross over the Tumen River.

Although all of North Korea is economically depressed after Soviet dissolution, Ryanggang province, along with neighboring North Hamgyong and South Hamgyong provinces, are the poorest, forming North Korea's "Rust Belt" of industrialized cities with factories now decrepit and failing. The worst hunger of the 1990s famine years occurred in these three provinces, and most refugees into China come from the Rust Belt region.

Ryanggang explosion

An explosion and mushroom cloud was reportedly detected in Kimhyŏngjik-gun on 9 September 2004, the 56th anniversary of the creation of North Korea.  This was reported a few days later on 12 September.

Power supply issues
In recent years, power supply problems have become prevalent in Ryanggang.

Administrative divisions
Ryanggang is divided into 2 cities (si) and 10 counties (kun). Each entity is listed below in English, Chosŏn'gŭl, and Hanja.

References

External links
 
 행정 구역 현황 (Haengjeong Guyeok Hyeonhwang) (in Korean only)

 
Provinces of North Korea